James F. Jessiman was a Scottish footballer who made over 100 appearances in the Scottish League for Morton as an inside forward and wing half. He also played for Arthurlie, Stenhousemuir, Raith Rovers and East Stirlingshire.

Career statistics

References 

Scottish footballers
Scottish Football League players
Arthurlie F.C. players
Raith Rovers F.C. players
Greenock Morton F.C. players
Stenhousemuir F.C. players
Year of birth missing
Year of death missing
Association football inside forwards
Association football wing halves
People from Barrhead
East Stirlingshire F.C. players
Sportspeople from East Renfrewshire